Nafteh may refer to places in Iran:
 Nafteh, Kermanshah (نفته - Nafteh)
 Nafteh, Razavi Khorasan (نفطه - Nafţeh)